Allama Iqbal International Airport (Punjabi) is the third largest civilian airport by traffic in Pakistan, after Jinnah International Airport, Karachi and Islamabad International Airport. It serves Lahore, capital of Punjab and second-largest city of Pakistan. It also serves a large portion of the travellers from the other regions of Punjab province. Originally known as Lahore International Airport, it was renamed after the poet philosopher Allama Iqbal, one of the pioneers that led to the creation of Pakistan. The airport has three terminals: the Allama Iqbal terminal, the Hajj terminal and a cargo terminal. The airport is about 15 km from the centre of the city.

History

Post independence 
At the time of the Independence of Pakistan, Walton Airport was the main airport of Lahore. Pakistan International Airlines (PIA) acquired its first jet aircraft Boeing 720, Walton Airport was unable to handle the load of Boeing 720. The Government of Pakistan decided to build a brand new airport, which opened in 1962. The airport had a specifically built runway and apron to handle aircraft up to the Boeing 747. This opened Lahore's gates to the world. PIA initiated direct flights to Dubai and London via Karachi.

Expansion

New Airport 
Over the course of the next twenty-five years, the demand for air travel rose. The government had to build a bigger terminal to meet the growing needs of the region. In March 2003, a new terminal was inaugurated by President General Pervez Musharraf, originally commissioned by then ex-Prime Minister Nawaz Sharif. The airport was named Allama Iqbal International Airport and became the second largest airport in Pakistan after the Jinnah International Airport in Karachi. All flights were switched to the new airport and the old airport was passed onto the military. However, the government later reclaimed the airport from the military and developed it into a Hajj terminal.

The Pakistan Civil Aviation Authority awarded the main contract to Airsys ATM, leader of a consortium with J&P Overseas Ltd, an international building and civil engineering contractor. Airsys ATM is a joint project from Thomson-CSF Airsys and Siemens, dedicated to air traffic management systems and airport development. The Airports Group in the UK was also awarded a $70 million contract for airport systems construction. The project was implemented by a consortium of Joannou & Paraskevaides (J&P), responsible for civil and building works, and the Airports Group, responsible for the implementation of the system. Airsys ATM and Thales ATM were responsible for the fabrication and installation of the air bridges at the new terminal.

In March 2006, PIA inaugurated nonstop services between Lahore and Toronto using Boeing 777s. In 2008, the national flag carrier of the UAE, Etihad Airways, opened a dedicated aircraft line maintenance facility at the airport. The facility is used for day-to-day technical line maintenance on Etihad aircraft, including hydraulic structural and instrument checks.

In October 2020, British Airways has resumed its direct flight operations to and from Lahore after 44 years.

Future plans 
Pakistan Civil Aviation Authority (PCAA) has planned the expansion of the terminal building and the number of gates will be increased from 7 to 22, with a corresponding increase in remote bays. This will increase the annual passenger capacity of Lahore Airport from 6 million to 20 million which will be sufficient to cater to the passenger load for the next 15 to 20 years.

The new design of the Lahore Airport Expansion Project has inspiration from the national flower of Pakistan, Jasmine or locally known as "Chambeli". The airport will have 4 arms similar to 4 platters of Jasmine flower. The original building has Mughal architectural features but the new airport will have a blend of Spanish and Mughal Architecture.

Gates in the main terminal building will be increased from seven to twenty-two. The present terminal building will not be demolished but will be expanded. The current parking area will be converted to arrival and departure lounges. The first phase that included the construction of the triple storey parking, in place of the front square lawn, has been complete and is now fully operational. The second phase which includes the upgradation of the main runway is underway.

The design of the airport was developed by GilBartolomé Architects from Spain, following a contract awarded to international Spanish Firm, TYSPA International, which firm also worked on expanding the Madrid and São Paulo Airports. A Chinese firm, the China Construction Third Engineering Bureau, has been awarded the contract, worth US$382 million (RMB 2.6 billion CNY), to carry out the construction work. During the expansion of the airport, nearby road network has also been improved, which has helped to ease traffic congestion on the roads leading to the terminal.

Structure 

LHE is fitted with all the essentials for domestic and international flights. The information below is correct as of September 2020.

Apron
7 air bridges with PSS & APSS facilities.
23 remote parking stands.

Runway
Two parallel runways: one concrete, the other asphalt. 
Runway 36R/18L: 3,360 metres long, 45 metres wide, 15 metres shoulders on both sides. Max capacity: Airbus A380. 
Runway 36L/18R: 2,743 metres long, 46 metres wide. Max capacity: Boeing 747-400.
Parallel taxiway for rapid entry/exit.
2 Rapid exit taxiways (Newly constructed).
Instrument Landing System Category-II and ILS CAT-III on RWY 36R.
Navigational Aids: DVOR/DME/TDME, NDB, OM, MM

Airport services
Pakistan State Oil provides fuel services to all airlines flying out of the airport. (Jet A-100)
Fire fighting and Rescue Services. Category: 9
FIDS systems located in the lounges and briefing concourses showing television programmes and flight information.
Airport Mosque, with five times daily and Jummah prayers, located outside the airport left-hand side of the terminal building.
CAA Porter services and Metro cab services are available.
Custom and Immigration for international flights.
Cargo and luggage wrapping services.
Passenger assistance services (upon request).
ATMs provided by MCB Bank Ltd, Allied Bank Ltd, National Bank of Pakistan, and Habib Bank Limited. The MCB ATM is linked to Mastercard; the ABL ATM is linked to Visa; the Habib Bank ATM is linked to Visa and Mastercard. All four are linked to China UnionPay and to the domestic 1LINK, MNET and PayPak switches. All these ATMs are also equipped with the IBFT (Interbank Funds Transfer) facility, as well as the utility bills payment facility. Standard Chartered Bank also offers two offsite ATMs within 1 km radius of the airport.
Full-service branches of National Bank of Pakistan, Habib Bank Ltd, Bank Al-Falah, and Allied Bank Ltd. The first three banks also feature Islamic banking counters to facilitate those customers with Islamic accounts.
Pakistan Post fully-staffed location featuring Datapost™ (International express delivery), UMS (Urgent Mail Service), Same-day packet and parcel delivery (to select cities nationwide), and Post Office Savings Bank™.

Ground handling agents
Pakistan International Airlines.
Shaheen Airport Services (SAPS).
Royal Airport Services (RAS).
Gerry's DNATA Ground Handling & Cargo.

Additional
Airfield Restrictions: None

Airlines and destinations

Passenger

Cargo

Statistics 
The following table provides details of the major traffic flows out of Lahore in terms of passenger numbers, aircraft movements, cargo and mail. Note that the Civil Aviation Authority of Pakistan operates with fiscal years starting on July and ending in June of next year. The results were collected from the Civil Aviation Authority of Pakistan website.:

Awards and recognitions 
 Allama Iqbal International Airport was ranked the world's leading airport by Singapore Airlines in-service performance in 2006.

See also
 Airlines of Pakistan
 List of airports in Pakistan
 Shaheen Airport Services
 Transport in Pakistan

References

External links 

 Allama Iqbal International Airport
 Allama Iqbal International Airport, Lahore 
 
 
 

Airports in Punjab, Pakistan
 
Lahore
Airports established in 1962
1962 establishments in Pakistan
Memorials to Muhammad Iqbal